The following tables list the computational complexity of various algorithms for common mathematical operations.

Here, complexity refers to the time complexity of performing computations on a multitape Turing machine. See big O notation for an explanation of the notation used.

Arithmetic functions 
This table lists the complexity of mathematical operations on integers.

Algebraic functions

Special functions 
Many of the methods in this section are given in Borwein & Borwein.

Elementary functions 
The elementary functions are constructed by composing arithmetic operations, the exponential function, the natural logarithm, trigonometric functions, and their inverses. The complexity of an elementary function is equivalent to that of its inverse, since all elementary functions are analytic and hence invertible by means of Newton's method.

Below, the size  refers to the number of digits of precision at which the function is to be evaluated.

It is not known whether  is the optimal complexity for elementary functions. The best known lower bound is the trivial bound 
.

Non-elementary functions

Mathematical constants 
This table gives the complexity of computing approximations to the given constants to  correct digits.

Number theory 
Algorithms for number theoretical calculations are studied in computational number theory.

Matrix algebra 

The following complexity figures assume that arithmetic with individual elements has complexity O(1), as is the case with fixed-precision floating-point arithmetic or operations on a finite field.

In 2005, Henry Cohn, Robert Kleinberg, Balázs Szegedy, and Chris Umans showed that either of two different conjectures would imply that the exponent of matrix multiplication is 2.

Transforms 
Algorithms for computing transforms of functions (particularly integral transforms) are widely used in all areas of mathematics, particularly analysis and signal processing.

Notes

References

Further reading 

 
 

Computer arithmetic algorithms
Computational complexity theory
Mathematics-related lists
Number theoretic algorithms
Unsolved problems in computer science